Lawrence Johnson may refer to:
Lawrence Johnson (pole vaulter) (born 1974), American pole-vaulter
Lawrence Alexander Sidney Johnson (1925–1997), Australian botanist
Lawrence Johnson (American football) (born 1957), former NFL cornerback with the Cleveland Browns and Buffalo Bills
Lawrence Johnson (type-founder) (1801–1860), American type-founder
Lawrence Johnson (Wisconsin politician) (1908–1994), Wisconsin Republican politician
Lawrence H. Johnson (1862–1947), Minnesota Republican politician
Birth name of Laurence Naismith (1908–1992), English actor

See also
Laurence Johnson (disambiguation)
Larry Johnson (disambiguation)
Lawrence Johnston (disambiguation)